Athelstan Frederick Spilhaus (November 25, 1911 – March 30, 1998) was a South African-American geophysicist and oceanographer. Among other accomplishments, Spilhaus is credited with proposing the establishment of Sea Grant Colleges at a meeting of the American Fisheries Society in 1963 as a parallel to the successful land-grant university system, which he claimed was "one of the best investments this nation ever made. The same kind of imagination and foresight should be applied to the exploration of the sea."

Biography

Spilhaus was born in 1911 in Cape Town, South Africa, grandson of the Scottish mathematician Thomas Muir. His mother was Nellie Spilhaus, (nee Muir), a South African human rights advocate, and his father was Karl Antonio Spilhaus, a South African merchant, born in Lisbon, Portugal and raised in Lübeck, Germany. In 1936, Spilhaus joined the Woods Hole Oceanographic Institution in Massachusetts, where he developed the bathythermograph, which made the measurement of ocean depths and temperatures from a moving vessel possible, a device which proved indispensable to submarine warfare. This invention established his international reputation. He became a US citizen in 1946. 

In 1949, he became Dean of the University of Minnesota's Institute of Technology and served in this role until 1966.

Spilhaus was the founder and original planner of the Minnesota Experimental City.

Spilhaus was also chair of the scientific advisory committee of the American Newspaper Publishers Association. He became known by the public for his Our New Age Sunday feature, which appeared in the color comics section of 93 newspapers (1957–1973). The strip therefore was quite influential in its time and John F. Kennedy is cited to have said on a meeting with Spilhaus in 1962: "The only science I ever learned was from your comic strip in the Boston Globe." Spilhaus apparently enjoyed authoring the feature; in response to a question about its broad scope in a mid-sixties TV interview, Spilhaus modestly replied he'd learned quite a lot by writing it.

He also served on the board of trustees of Science Service, now known as Society for Science & the Public, from 1965 to 1978. He was elected as a member to the American Philosophical Society in 1968. 

He was the prime mover behind The Experimental City project, intended to build a futuristic, pollution-free city. The project never came to fruition despite his 30 years of advocacy for it. It is the subject of a 2017 film documentary, The Experimental City.

In an interview for the American Institute of Physics he stated with reference to a question on his religious views that he was an Episcopalian.

References

Further reading

External links
 Lots of Time: The Spilhaus Clock and its Functions
The Experimental City documentary

1911 births
1998 deaths
20th-century American Episcopalians
American oceanographers
People from Cape Town
South African emigrants to the United States
University of Minnesota faculty